Juan Gerardo Sison Gómez de Liaño (born November 19, 1999), also known as Juan GDL, is a Filipino professional basketball player for BC Wolves of the Lithuanian Basketball League. Gómez de Liaño played for the University of the Philippines Fighting Maroons of the UAAP during his collegiate career. He plays the point guard and shooting guard positions.

Early life 
Juan was born on November 19, 1999, in Mandaluyong, Philippines. He is the third of six siblings, five of them are into basketball. His older brother, Javi, plays for the Terrafirma Dyip of the Philippine Basketball Association.

Collegiate career

UAAP Season 80 (2017) 
Gómez de Liaño's rookie season was in 2017 in which he won Rookie of the Year, a year after getting the Most Valuable Player award at the junior level. He also got the MVP award in 2016 playing in the Philippine Chinese Amateur Basketball League Freego Cup.

UAAP Season 81 (2018) 
This was a breakout year for Gómez de Liaño as he brought the UP Fighting Maroons to the UAAP Finals after thirty-two years. The awards given to Juan that year were: Playmaker of the Season (with a rare triple double), Mythical 5, Assist Leader and Second in Scoring.

UAAP Season 82 (2019) 
On his last season with the Maroons, Gómez de Liaño was able to help the team finish third.

Amateur and 3x3 career

Dubai International Basketball Tournament 
In 2019, Gómez de Liaño played point guard alongside teammates Justin Brownlee, Lamar Odom, and was coached by Charles Tiu under the Mighty Sports team, who went far until the semi-final round.

In 2020, Gómez de Liaño finally bagged the championship for Mighty Sports coached once again by Charles Tiu. His notable teammates were ex-NBA players Renaldo Balkman and Andray Blatche.

PBA D-League 
In 2020, Gómez de Liaño played for a couple of games for Marinerong Pilipino before being called up for the Philippine national team.

In 2022, Gómez de Liaño was awarded the MVP of the Aspirant's Cup while playing again for Marinerong Pilipino. He steered the team to the finals but eventually lost to the Eco Oil-La Salle Green Archers.

Maharlika Pilipinas Basketball League (2021) 
Representing Nueva Ecija Rice Vanguards in his first 3x3 tournament, Gómez de Liaño was able to lead the team to the finals against the Philippine National Team under Chooks-to-Go.

ASEAN Basketball League (2022) 
Gómez de Liaño's team, Platinum Karaoke, placed third in the 3x3 tournament held in Indonesia. He also played for the BBM CLS Knights where they awarded the preseason champions.

Professional career

Earth Friends Tokyo Z (2021) 
On June 23, 2021, Gómez de Liaño signed with Earth Friends Tokyo Z of the B2 League. He was also selected as part of the B.League Rising Stars. At the same time, his older brother Javi played in the same league for the Ibaraki Robots.

BC Wolves (2022–present) 
After a stint with Marinerong Pilipino in the PBA D-League, Gómez de Liaño then signed with the BC Wolves for their LKL campaign on October 20, 2022.

Career stats

B. League

National team career 
Gómez de Liaño played for the Philippines on the 2015 FIBA Asia Under-16 Championship in Indonesia and were champions in the SEABA.

He also played in the 2017 FIBA 3x3 U18 World Cup in China.

He played for the first and second windows of the 2022 FIBA Asia Cup qualification against Indonesia and Thailand. His averages were 12 points, 3 assists and 3 rebounds. On the second FIBA window, he had the chance to play with his brother Javi where he averaged double-digit points a game. Both were named players of the game. Games were played in the Philippines and Bahrain.

Gómez de Liaño was called again to represent the national team for the third window of the 2023 FIBA Basketball World Cup qualification against New Zealand and India.

Career highlights 

 2016 NBTC MVP

 2016 SLAM Rising Stars Classic MVP

 2016 UAAP Juniors Mythical 5

 2016 PCABL Summer MVP

 2017 UAAP Juniors MVP

 2017 UAAP Seniors Rookie of the Year

 2018 UAAP Mythical 5

 2018 UAAP Second in Scoring

 2018 UAAP Leader in Assist

 2018 UAAP Playmaker of the Season

 2018 UAAP Triple double stats

 2022 PBA D-League MVP

 2022 PBA D-League Scoring Leader

 2022 PBA D-League Assist Leader

References

External links 
 Profile at FIBA website

1999 births
Living people
Basketball players from Metro Manila
BC Wolves players
Citizens of Spain through descent
Earth Friends Tokyo Z players
Filipino expatriate basketball people in Lithuania
Filipino expatriate basketball people in Indonesia
Filipino expatriate basketball people in Japan
Filipino men's 3x3 basketball players
Filipino men's basketball players
Filipino people of Spanish descent
People from Mandaluyong
Philippines men's national basketball team players
Point guards
Shooting guards
Spanish men's basketball players
Spanish men's 3x3 basketball players
UP Fighting Maroons basketball players